Huhtamo is a Finnish-language surname that may refer to:

 Kari Huhtamo (born 1943), Finnish sculptor
 Markku Huhtamo (born 1946), Finnish actor

References

Finnish-language surnames